Girdin is a protein that in humans is encoded by the CCDC88A gene. Although its cellular function are not fully elucidated, it has been associated with glioma.

References

External links
DISC1 Players Gird For Adult Neurodevelopment - Schizophrenia Research Forum, 8 oct 2009

Further reading